Juan Manuel Barrera (born 28 June 1991) is an Argentine professional footballer who plays as a centre-back for Martina.

Career
Barrera started his career without any youth stints, as he joined Liga Mendocina team Andes Talleres at the age of sixteen. Godoy Cruz were Barrera's next club, though the defender didn't feature for the club; he was, however, a substitute three times in league and cup. In January 2015, Barrera signed for Unión Mar del Plata of Primera B Nacional. He made eighteen appearances for them in 2015 as they were relegated to Torneo Federal A. Barrera remained in the second tier with Independiente Rivadavia. A sole appearance against Nueva Chicago on 5 March 2016 preceded a move to Torneo Federal A's Gutiérrez.

For Gutiérrez, he netted goals versus Gimnasia y Esgrima and San Lorenzo in 2016–17 as they reached phase four of the play-offs. Barrera rejoined Independiente Rivadavia of Primera B Nacional on 18 August 2017. The centre-back remained for two years, though only featured nine times in total; including just once, in the Copa Argentina, in 2018–19. Barrera headed to Torneo Federal A in July 2019 with Huracán Las Heras, with eighteen appearances and one goal (versus Deportivo Maipú in the cup) following. August 2020 saw Barrera move abroad for the first time, joining Italian Eccellenza Apulia side Martina.

Career statistics
.

Honours
Andes Talleres
Liga Mendocina: 2009, 2011

References

External links

1991 births
Living people
Sportspeople from Mendoza Province
Argentine footballers
Association football defenders
Argentine expatriate footballers
Argentine expatriate sportspeople in Italy
Expatriate footballers in Italy
Primera Nacional players
Torneo Federal A players
Godoy Cruz Antonio Tomba footballers
Unión de Mar del Plata footballers
Independiente Rivadavia footballers
A.S.D. Martina Calcio 1947 players